Leslie Notši (born 5 September 1964) is a Mosotho former footballer who played as midfielder. He was most recently manager for Kick4Life, but has previously coached the Lesotho national football team.

Career
Between September and December 2009 he was a caretaker coach of the Lesotho national football team. Since April 2011 until December 2013 he again coached the Lesotho national football team. Also he coached Matlama FC, South African United FC and Garankuwa United F.C. In 2019, following the ill health of Moses Maliehe, Notši took up a caretaker role of Lesotho, beating South Africa on aggregate 6–2 in the African Nations Championship.

References

External links

Profile at Soccerpunter.com

1964 births
Living people
Lesotho footballers
Association football midfielders
Lesotho football managers
Lesotho national football team managers
Expatriate soccer managers in South Africa
Lesotho expatriates in South Africa
Place of birth missing (living people)